Brentwood Strangler is a 2015 holiday-themed horror short film. It was written and directed by John Fitzpatrick following the success of his first short Skypemare, and stars 'scream queen' Jordan Ladd and Australian actor Adam J. Yeend in the title role. The film premiered December 2015 at the A Night of Horror Film Festival in Sydney, Australia, and had its U.S. premiere in early 2016 at the Hollywood Reel Independent Film Festival in Los Angeles where it won the jury award for Best Genre Short. The film has received critical acclaim from the independent horror community with multiple online reviews citing Fitzpatrick's writing, and the chemistry between the two leads. The film has screened at multiple festivals and horror conventions around the world including Shriekfest, Horrible Imaginings Film Festival, FilmQuest, and at Phoenix Comicon where it won the audience award for 'Best Horror'. The producing team went on to make the popular online series Scary Endings which is currently in its second season.

Plot
It's the Christmas season in Los Angeles; Maggie (Jordan Ladd), a lonely woman goes on a blind date with a man unbeknownst to her that her date has been replaced by an active and notorious serial killer, The Brentwood Strangler (Adam J. Yeend). Is it love at first sight or is Maggie in for the worst (and last) date of her life?

Production
The film was financed by Far From Everything Films and shot on location in Camarillo, California not only for cheaper studio rental but because street locations could be made to look similar to that of Brentwood, Los Angeles. Writer, Director John Fitzpatrick said in making the film he wanted to turn "back the clock to the days of Michael Curtiz, Billy Wilder and Alfred Hitchcock." Producer / Actor Adam J. Yeend was cast first in the role of the Strangler but asked to audition by Fitzpatrick followed by Jordan Ladd being cast in the lead role following an introduction from Skypemare actress Cerina Vincent; the two had worked together previously on Cabin Fever. Actress Annika Marks was asked to reprise her Skypemare role as Jenna and cameos along with producer Ryan Dillon reprising his role as Steve. Australian actors Cameron Daddo and Roxane Wilson also have cameo roles as news reporters. Maximilian Osinski was the final lead to be cast, a friend of Yeend's, Fitzpatrick felt the audience would buy that based on a single photo, it'd make sense for Maggie to confuse the two men in the story.

Cast 
 Jordan Ladd as Maggie
 Adam J. Yeend as Floyd Garrison, The Strangler
 Maximilian Osinski as Richard Chase
 Annika Marks as Jenna
 Ryan Dillon as Steve
 Cameron Daddo as Bruce Black
 Desean Terry as Officer Canon

Awards and nominations

References

External links

Reviews 
Horror Society
We Are Indie Horror
HorrorBuzz
Gruesome Magazine
Horror Freak News
Gourmet Horror

Other sites 
Official website

2015 films
2010s mystery horror films
American horror short films
2010s mystery films
American mystery horror films
2010s Christmas horror films
Films shot in California
American Christmas horror films
Films shot in Los Angeles
2010s English-language films
2010s American films